Allani Sridhar is an Indian screenwriter and film director working mainly in Telugu cinema. He made his directorial debut with the critically acclaimed 1988 biopic feature film, Komaram Bheem, in which he also acted. In 1990, the film won the then Andhra Pradesh state Nandi Award for best film on national integration.

Early life

Allani Sridhar was born to a farmer's family in Medak district of Telangana state. The family got shifted to Hyderabad during his early childhood. He spent most of his childhood and youth days in Hyderabad. He finished his schooling from Andhra Vidhyalaya High School in Chikkadpally where he scored top grades in the school's recent history then. Subsequently, he joined a polytechnic course only to quit it in the middle to pursue his love for movies.

Career

Writing

He began his career as a writer in a weekly magazine and wrote a serial story called "Campus, Campus" which was a huge hit in those days. It compiled a huge readership, particularly among college goers.

Direction

Sridhar began his career as a director with a film about Gond tribal people titled Komaram Bheem, for which he won an award for best director from the Government of Andhra Pradesh. Since then he has worked in numerous movie genres using both the Telugu and Hindi languages. He has also directed some television serials and educational material for the state government.

Positions held

Sridhar has chaired several prestigious positions in the industry and has held the position of president for both the Hyderabad Film Club and the Telangana Cinema Directors Association.  He was a jury member on the Nandi TV awards committee in 2004 and on the Nandi Film awards committee in 2006 and 2011.

Sridhar has his own production house, Filmedia Productions Pvt. Ltd.

Awards and honours
Nandi Awards
Nandi Award for Best First Film of a Director - Komaram Bheem
"Nandi" TV award for "best screen play writer" – serial "Katama Raju Kathalu"
Other Awards

"Best television director" by Yuva Kala Vahini.
Best Director award by special critics jury for Hindi film "Tuhi Meri Ganga" at International Film Festival, U.S.A.
Komaram Bheem memorial national award

Filmography
Aside from television serials and AD films, Sridhar has directed the following movies:

Telugu:
Komaram Bheem
Raghuluthunna Bharatham
Preme Naa Pranam
Uthsaaham
Jai Sri Balaji
Goutama Buddha
Hanuman Chalisa
Hostel Days
Chilukuru Balaji

Hindi:
Tuhi Meri Ganga
Tathagatha Buddha
Goswami Tulasidas

Personal life
Allani Sridhar has five sisters and a brother. He is married to Nirmala and they have two children.

References

Telugu screenwriters
Nandi Award winners
People from Medak district
Screenwriters from Telangana
1962 births
Living people